Pedro Schwartz Girón (born 1935), OBE, is a Spanish economist and former politician.

Early life
Schwartz was born on 30 January 1935 in Madrid. His father was Juan Schwartz Díaz-Flores, a diplomat who served as Spanish ambassador in Austria and contributed to the salvation of jews during the Holocaust. Schwartz graduated from the Complutense University of Madrid, where he received bachelor of arts and doctorate of law degrees. He received a master's degree and a PhD in Economics from the London School of Economics.  He married his first wife, Mercedes Juste Werner in 1966, and had one child. He has three children with his second wife Ana Maria Bravo Zabalgoitia (born 1945).

Career
Schwartz is the Fundación Rafael del Pino Research Professor of Economics at CEU San Pablo University. He is also a visiting lecturer in Economics at the University of Buckingham. He serves as an adjunct scholar at the Cato Institute.

Schwartz joined the Mont Pelerin Society in 1977.

He was a member of the 2nd Congress of Deputies (1982–1986).

Schwartz became a member of the Real Academia de Ciencias Morales y Políticas on 22 February 2005.

He served as president of the Mont Pelerin Society between 2014 and 2016.

Schwartz was made Honorary Officer of the Order of the British Empire in 1990.

References

Living people
Complutense University of Madrid alumni
Alumni of the London School of Economics
Spanish economists
Honorary Officers of the Order of the British Empire
Members of the 2nd Congress of Deputies (Spain)
1935 births
Member of the Mont Pelerin Society